The 2019 Giro d'Italia is the 102nd edition of the Giro d'Italia, one of cycling's Grand Tours. The Giro began in Bologna with an individual time trial on 11 May, and Stage 12 occurred on 23 May with a stage from Cuneo. The race finished in Verona on 2 June.

Stage 12

23 May 2019 - Cuneo to Pinerolo, 

The climb has an average gradient of 9.5%. The riders will also pass over the short but steep climb of the Via Principi d'Acaja, on two occasions, along the route. The first climb will occur before the climb to Montoso, and the second climb will occur in the last  of the stage.

Stage 13

24 May 2019 - Pinerolo to Ceresole Reale (Serrù Lake),

Stage 14

25 May 2019 - Saint-Vincent to Courmayeur (Skyway Monte Bianco),

Stage 15

26 May 2019 - Ivrea to Como,

Rest day 2
27 May 2019

Stage 16

28 May 2019 - Lovere to Ponte di Legno,

Stage 17

29 May 2019 - Commezzadura (Val di Sole) to Anterselva/Antholz,

Stage 18

30 May 2019 - Valdaora/Olang to Santa Maria di Sala,

Stage 19

31 May 2019 - Treviso to San Martino di Castrozza,

Stage 20

1 June 2019 - Feltre to Croce d’Aune-Monte Avena, 

A spectator caused Miguel Ángel López to be knocked off his bike with  remaining, losing time on the group of favourites. López responded by hitting the spectator, but escaped sanction from the race officials. After receiving a long push uphill from a spectator on the  climb of the Croce d'Aune, Primož Roglič was given a ten-second penalty for not refusing help.

Stage 21

2 June 2019 - Verona to Verona,  (ITT)

The riders departed in reverse order to the general classification, at one-minute intervals, starting at 13:45 CEST. The top twenty riders, on the general classification, departed at three-minute intervals.

Notes

References

2019 Giro d'Italia
Giro d'Italia stages